Herman Stokes (October 16, 1932 – January 25, 1998) was an American athlete. He competed in the men's triple jump at the 1960 Summer Olympics.

References

External links
 

1932 births
1998 deaths
Athletes (track and field) at the 1960 Summer Olympics
American male triple jumpers
Olympic track and field athletes of the United States
Track and field athletes from Houston
Pan American Games medalists in athletics (track and field)
Pan American Games silver medalists for the United States
Athletes (track and field) at the 1959 Pan American Games
Athletes (track and field) at the 1963 Pan American Games
Medalists at the 1959 Pan American Games